Prospect Street may refer to the following places:

Canada
 Prospect Street, local name for  York Regional Road 34 in Newmarket, Ontario

United States
Historic Districts:
 Prospect Street Historic District, New London, Connecticut
 South Prospect Street Historic District, Hagerstown, Maryland 
 Mill-Prospect Street Historic District, Hatfield, Massachusetts
 Prospect-Gaylord Historic District, Amherst, Massachusetts

Historic Houses:
 House at 88 Prospect Street, Wakefield, Massachusetts
 House at 90 Prospect Street, Wakefield, Massachusetts
 House at 491 Prospect Street, Methuen, Massachusetts
 House at 526 Prospect Street, Methuen, Massachusetts

See also
 Prospect Avenue (disambiguation)
 Prospect Park (disambiguation)
 "Prospect Street", a 1985 song by the Big Dish